Miliusa zeylanica is a species of plant in the Annonaceae family. It is endemic to Sri Lanka.

References

Flora of Sri Lanka
zeylanica
Vulnerable plants
Taxonomy articles created by Polbot